Panagiotis Moraitis (born 1 February 1997) is a Greek professional footballer who plays as a striker for Super League 2 club Apollon Smyrnis.

Club career

Budućnost Podgorica
On 26 February 2020, Moraitis signed a half-season contract with Montenegrin First League club Budućnost Podgorica. He scored eight goals in his first nine league matches for Budućnost. Moraitis remained in Montenegro during the COVID-19 pandemic and at one point was obligated to serve the Hellenic Armed Forces as a conscript in June 2020. However, an agreement was made such that he no longer needed to serve for the time being.

Borac Banja Luka
On 1 March 2021, Moraitis signed a contract with Bosnian Premier League club Borac Banja Luka. He officially debuted for Borac in a Bosnian Cup game against Široki Brijeg on 10 March 2021. Moraitis scored his first goal for the club in a league game against Radnik Bijeljina on 2 April 2021. He won his first trophy with Borac on 23 May 2021, getting crowned Bosnian Premier League champions one game before the end of the 2020–21 season.

International career
Moraitis represented Greece on various youth levels.

Honours
Panachaiki
Gamma Ethniki: 2016–17

Budućnost Podgorica
Montenegrin First League: 2019–20

Borac Banja Luka
Bosnian Premier League: 2020–21

References

External links

1997 births
Living people
Greek footballers
Greek expatriate footballers
Greece under-21 international footballers
Greece youth international footballers
Football League (Greece) players
Super League Greece 2 players
Montenegrin First League players
Premier League of Bosnia and Herzegovina players
Panachaiki F.C. players
FK Budućnost Podgorica players
FK Borac Banja Luka players
Association football forwards
Footballers from Agrinio